The following is an alphabetical list of articles related to the U.S. state of Georgia.

0–9

.ga.us – Internet second-level domain for the state of Georgia
4th state to ratify the Constitution of the United States

A
Adams-Onís Treaty of 1819
Adjacent states:

Agriculture in the state of Georgia
Airports in the state of Georgia
Alpharetta, GA
Amusement parks in the state of Georgia
Appalachia
Appling County, Georgia
Aquaria in the state of Georgia
commons:Category:Aquaria in Georgia (U.S. state)
Arboreta in the state of Georgia
commons:Category:Arboreta in Georgia (U.S. state)
Archaeology in the state of Georgia
:Category:Archaeological sites in Georgia (U.S. state)
commons:Category:Archaeological sites in Georgia (U.S. state)
Architecture in the state of Georgia
Area codes in the state of Georgia
Art museums and galleries in the state of Georgia
commons:Category:Art museums and galleries in Georgia (U.S. state)
Atkinson County, Georgia
Atlanta, Georgia, state capital since 1868
Atlanta metropolitan area largest urban center in Georgia, ninth largest in the United States
Augusta, Georgia, state capital 1779–1780, 1781–1782, and 1786–1796

B

Bacon County, Georgia
Baker County, Georgia
Baldwin County, Georgia
Banks County, Georgia
Barrow County, Georgia
Bartow County, Georgia
Battle of Adairsville
Battle of Allatoona
Battle of Atlanta
Battle of Brown's Mill
Battle of Chickamauga
Battle of Columbus (1865)
Battle of Dallas
Battle of Davis' Cross Roads
Battle of Ezra Church
Battle of Fort McAllister (1863)
Battle of Fort McAllister (1864)
Battle of Griswoldville
Battle of Jonesborough
Battle of Kennesaw Mountain
Battle of Kolb's Farm
Battle of Lovejoy's Station
Battle of Marietta
Battle of New Hope Church
Battle of Noonday Creek
Battle of Peachtree Creek
Battle of Pickett's Mill
Battle of Rensaca
Battle of Ringgold Gap
Battle of Rocky Face Ridge
Battle of Rome Cross Roads
Battle of Ruff's Station
Battle of Utoy Creek
Battle of Wassaw Sound
Battle of Wauhatchie
Battle of Waynesboro, Georgia
Battle of West Point
Ben Hill County, Georgia
Berrien County, Georgia
Bibb County, Georgia
Black Belt
Bleckley County, Georgia
Brantley County, Georgia
Brooks County, Georgia
Botanical gardens in the state of Georgia
commons:Category:Botanical gardens in Georgia (U.S. state)
Brasstown Valley Resort
Bryan County, Georgia
Buildings and structures in the state of Georgia
commons:Category:Buildings and structures in Georgia (U.S. state)

 Bulloch County, Georgia
 Burke County, Georgia
 Butts County, Georgia

C

Calhoun County, Georgia
Camden County, Georgia
Candler County, Georgia
Canyons and gorges of the state of Georgia
commons:Category:Canyons and gorges of Georgia (U.S. state)
Capital of the state of Georgia
Georgia State Capitol
commons:Category:Georgia State Capitol
Carroll County, Georgia
Catoosa County, Georgia
Census statistical areas of the State of Georgia
Charlton County, Georgia
Chatham County, Georgia
Chattahoochee County, Georgia
Chattooga County, Georgia
Cherokee County, Georgia
Cities in the state of Georgia
commons:Category:Cities in Georgia (U.S. state)
Clarke County, Georgia
Clay County, Georgia
Clayton County, Georgia
Clinch County, Georgia
Climate of the state of Georgia
:Category:Climate of Georgia (U.S. state)
commons:Category:Climate of Georgia (U.S. state)
Climate change in Georgia 
Cobb County, Georgia
Coffee County, Georgia
Colleges and universities in the state of Georgia
commons:Category:Universities and colleges in Georgia (U.S. state)
Colony of Georgia, 1732–1755

Colquitt County, Georgia
Columbia County, Georgia
Cook County, Georgia
Communications in the state of Georgia
commons:Category:Communications in Georgia (U.S. state)
Companies in the state of Georgia
:Category:Companies based in Georgia (U.S. state)
Congressional districts of the state of Georgia
Constitution of the State of Georgia
Convention centers in the state of Georgia
commons:Category:Convention centers in Georgia (U.S. state)
Counties of the state of Georgia
commons:Category:Counties in Georgia (U.S. state)
Coweta County, Georgia
Crawford County, Georgia
Crisp County, Georgia
Culture of the state of Georgia
:Category:Georgia (U.S. state) culture
commons:Category:Georgia (U.S. state) culture

D
Dade County, Georgia
Dawson County, Georgia
Decatur County, Georgia
DeKalb County, Georgia
Demographics of the State of Georgia
Dodge County, Georgia
Dooly County, Georgia
Dougherty County, Georgia
Douglas County, Georgia

E
Early County, Georgia
Ebenezer, Georgia, state capital 1782-1784
Echols County, Georgia
Economy of the State of Georgia
:Category:Economy of Georgia (U.S. state)
commons:Category:Economy of Georgia (U.S. state)
Education in the State of Georgia
:Category:Education in Georgia (U.S. state)
commons:Category:Education in Georgia (U.S. state)
Effingham County, Georgia
Elbert County, Georgia
Elections of the State of Georgia
commons:Category:Georgia (U.S. state) elections
Emanuel County, Georgia
Environment of the State of Georgia
commons:Category:Environment of Georgia (U.S. state)

 Evans County, Georgia

F
Fannin County, Georgia
Fayette County, Georgia

Festivals in the state of Georgia
commons:Category:Festivals in Georgia (U.S. state)
First Battle of Dalton
First ladies of Georgia (U.S. state)
Flag of the state of Georgia
Floyd County, Georgia
Forsyth County, Georgia
Forts in the state of Georgia
:Category:Forts in Georgia (U.S. state)
commons:Category:Forts in Georgia (U.S. state)

 Franklin County, Georgia
 Fulton County, Georgia

G

GA – United States Postal Service postal code for the state of Georgia
Geologic map of Georgia
Geography of the state of Georgia
:Category:Geography of Georgia (U.S. state)
commons:Category:Geography of Georgia (U.S. state)
Geology of the state of Georgia
:Category:Geology of Georgia (U.S. state)
commons:Category:Geology of Georgia (U.S. state)

George Washington Carver State Park
Georgia USA  website
:Category:Georgia (U.S. state)
commons:Category:Georgia (U.S. state)
commons:Category:Maps of Georgia (U.S. state)
Georgia v. Smith
Georgia Brass Band
Georgia Budget & Policy Institute
Georgia Career Information System
Georgia–Carolina Memorial Bridge
Georgia cracker
Georgia Council for International Visitors
Georgia District Church of the Nazarene
Georgia during Reconstruction, 1865–1870
Georgia Electronic Insurance Compliance System
Georgia in the American Civil War, 1861–1865
Georgia Legal Services Program
Georgia Political Science Association
Georgia State Capitol
Georgia State Patrol
Georgia Statewide Minority Business Enterprise Center
Georgia Stimulus Plan
Georgia (U.S. state) wiretapping laws
Ghost towns in the state of Georgia
:Category:Ghost towns in Georgia (U.S. state)
commons:Category:Ghost towns in Georgia (U.S. state)
Gilmer County, Georgia
Glascock County, Georgia
Glynn County, Georgia
Golf clubs and courses in the state of Georgia
Gordon County, Georgia
Government of the state of Georgia  website
:Category:Government of Georgia (U.S. state)
commons:Category:Government of Georgia (U.S. state)
Governor of the State of Georgia
List of governors of the State of Georgia
Grady County, Georgia
Great Seal of the State of Georgia
Greene County, Georgia
Gwinnett County, Georgia

H
Habersham County, Georgia
Hall County, Georgia
Hancock County, Georgia
Haralson County, Georgia
Harris County, Georgia
Hart County, Georgia
Heard County, Georgia
Heard's Fort, Georgia, state capital 1780-1781
Henry County, Georgia
Heritage railroads in the state of Georgia
commons:Category:Heritage railroads in Georgia (U.S. state)
Higher education in the state of Georgia
Hiking trails in the state of Georgia
commons:Category:Hiking trails in Georgia (U.S. state)
History of the state of Georgia
Historical outline of the state of Georgia
:Category:History of Georgia (U.S. state)
commons:Category:History of Georgia (U.S. state)
Hospitals in the state of Georgia
Hot springs of the state of Georgia
commons:Category:Hot springs of Georgia (U.S. state)
House of Representatives of the State of Georgia
Houston County, Georgia
Holy Rollerz Christian Car Club
Linda W. Hunter

I
Images of the state of Georgia
commons:Category:Georgia (U.S. state)
Irwin County, Georgia
Islands of the state of Georgia

J

 Jackson County, Georgia
 Jasper County, Georgia
 Jeff Davis County, Georgia
 Jefferson County, Georgia
 Jenkins County, Georgia
 Johnson County, Georgia
 Jones County, Georgia

K

L
La Florida, (1565–1732)-1763
Lakes of the state of Georgia
commons:Category:Lakes of Georgia (U.S. state)
Lamar County, Georgia
Landmarks in the state of Georgia
commons:Category:Landmarks in Georgia (U.S. state)
Lanier County, Georgia
Laurens County, Georgia
Lee County, Georgia
Liberty County, Georgia
Lieutenant Governor of the State of Georgia
Lincoln County, Georgia
Lists related to the state of Georgia:
List of airports in the state of Georgia
List of census statistical areas in the state of Georgia
List of cities in the state of Georgia
List of colleges and universities in the state of Georgia
List of companies in the state of Georgia
List of United States congressional districts in the state of Georgia
List of counties in the state of Georgia
List of forts in the State of Georgia
List of ghost towns in the state of Georgia
List of governors of the state of Georgia
List of high schools in the state of Georgia
List of hospitals in the state of Georgia
List of individuals executed by the state of Georgia
List of islands of the state of Georgia
List of law enforcement agencies in the state of Georgia
List of lieutenant governors of the state of Georgia
List of museums in the state of Georgia
List of National Historic Landmarks in the state of Georgia
List of newspapers in the state of Georgia
List of people from the state of Georgia
List of places in the state of Georgia
List of radio stations in the state of Georgia
List of railroads in the state of Georgia
List of Registered Historic Places in Georgia
List of rivers in the state of Georgia
List of school districts in the state of Georgia
List of schools in the state of Georgia
List of snakes in the state of Georgia
List of state forests in Georgia
List of state highway routes in Georgia
List of state parks in Georgia
List of state prisons in Georgia
List of symbols of the state of Georgia
List of telephone area codes in the state of Georgia
List of television stations in the state of Georgia
United States congressional delegations from Georgia
List of United States congressional districts in Georgia
List of United States representatives from Georgia
List of United States senators from Georgia
Long County, Georgia
Louisville, Georgia, state capital 1796-1807
Lowndes County, Georgia
Lumpkin County, Georgia

M
Macon County, Georgia
Macon, Georgia, state capital 1864-1865
Madison County, Georgia
Maps of the state of Georgia
commons:Category:Maps of Georgia (U.S. state)
Marion County, Georgia
McDuffie County, Georgia
McIntosh County, Georgia
Meriwether County, Georgia
Milledgeville, Georgia, state capital 1807-1864 and 1865–1868
Miller County, Georgia
Mitchell County, Georgia
Monroe County, Georgia
Montgomery County, Georgia
Monuments and memorials in the state of Georgia
commons:Category:Monuments and memorials in Georgia (U.S. state)
Mountains of the state of Georgia
commons:Category:Mountains of Georgia (U.S. state)
Morgan County, Georgia
Murray County, Georgia
Muscogee County, Georgia
Museums in the state of Georgia
:Category:Museums in Georgia (U.S. state)
commons:Category:Museums in Georgia (U.S. state)
Music of the state of Georgia
commons:Category:Music of Georgia (U.S. state)
:Category:Georgia (U.S. state) musical groups
:Category:Musicians from Georgia (U.S. state)

N
National Forests of the state of Georgia
commons:Category:National Forests of Georgia (U.S. state)
Natural history of the state of Georgia
commons:Category:Natural history of Georgia (U.S. state)
Nature centers in the state of Georgia
commons:Category:Nature centers in Georgia (U.S. state)
News media in the state of Georgia
Newspapers of the state of Georgia
Newton County, Georgia

O
Oconee County, Georgia
Oglethorpe County, Georgia
Outdoor sculptures in the state of Georgia
commons:Category:Outdoor sculptures in Georgia (U.S. state)

P
Paulding County, Georgia
Peach County, Georgia
People from Georgia (U.S. state)
:Category:People from Georgia (U.S. state)
commons:Category:People from Georgia (U.S. state)
:Category:People by city in Georgia (U.S. state)
:Category:People from Georgia (U.S. state) by occupation
Pickens County, Georgia
Pierce County, Georgia
Pike County, Georgia
Places in the state of Georgia
Politics of Georgia (U.S. state)
:Category:Politics of Georgia (U.S. state)
commons:Category:Politics of Georgia (U.S. state)
Polk County, Georgia
Protected areas of the state of Georgia
:Category:Protected areas of Georgia (U.S. state)
commons:Category:Protected areas of Georgia (U.S. state)
Province of Georgia, 1755–1776
Pulaski County, Georgia
Putnam County, Georgia

Q

 Quitman County, Georgia

R
Rabun County, Georgia
Radio stations in the state of Georgia
Railroad museums in the state of Georgia
commons:Category:Railroad museums in Georgia (U.S. state)
Railroads in the state of Georgia
Randolph County, Georgia
Registered historic places in the state of Georgia
commons:Category:Registered Historic Places in Georgia (U.S. state)
Religion in the state of Georgia
:Category:Religion in Georgia (U.S. state)
Richmond County, Georgia
Rivers of the state of Georgia
commons:Category:Rivers of Georgia (U.S. state)

 Rockdale County, Georgia

S
Savannah, Georgia, colonial capital 1733–1776, state capital 1776–1779, 1782 and 1784–1786
Schley County, Georgia
School districts in the state of Georgia
Schools in the state of Georgia
Scouting in the state of Georgia
Screven County, Georgia
Second Battle of Dalton
Seminole County, Georgia
Senate of the State of Georgia
Settlements in the state of Georgia
Cities in the state of Georgia
Towns in the state of Georgia
Villages in the state of Georgia
Census Designated Places in the state of Georgia
Other unincorporated communities in the state of Georgia
List of ghost towns in the state of Georgia
List of places in the state of Georgia
Skirmish at Pace's Ferry
Spalding County, Georgia
Sports in Georgia (U.S. state)
:Category:Sports in Georgia (U.S. state)
commons:Category:Sports in Georgia (U.S. state)
:Category:Sports venues in Georgia (U.S. state)
commons:Category:Sports venues in Georgia (U.S. state)
State Capitol of Georgia
State highway routes in Georgia
State of Georgia  website
Constitution of the State of Georgia
Government of the state of Georgia
:Category:Government of Georgia (U.S. state)
commons:Category:Government of Georgia (U.S. state)
Executive branch of the government of the state of Georgia
Governor of the state of Georgia
Legislative branch of the government of the state of Georgia
Legislature of the state of Georgia
Senate of the State of Georgia
House of Representatives of the State of Georgia
Judicial branch of the government of the state of Georgia
Supreme Court of the State of Georgia
State parks of Georgia
commons:Category:State parks of Georgia (U.S. state)
State Patrol of Georgia
State prisons of Georgia
Stephens County, Georgia
Stewart County, Georgia
Storehouse Furniture
Structures in Georgia (U.S. state)
commons:Category:Buildings and structures in Georgia (U.S. state)
Sumter County, Georgia
Supreme Court of the State of Georgia
Symbols of the state of Georgia
:Category:Symbols of Georgia (U.S. state)
commons:Category:Symbols of Georgia (U.S. state)

T
Talbot County, Georgia
Taliaferro County, Georgia
Tattnall County, Georgia
Taylor County, Georgia
Telecommunications in the State of Georgia
commons:Category:Communications in Georgia (U.S. state)
Telephone area codes in the State of Georgia
Television shows set in the State of Georgia
Television stations in the State of Georgia
Telfair County, Georgia
Tennessee Valley Authority
Terrell County, Georgia
Theatres in the State of Georgia
commons:Category:Theatres in Georgia (U.S. state)
Thomas County, Georgia
Tift County, Georgia
Toombs County, Georgia
Tourism in the State of Georgia  website
commons:Category:Tourism in Georgia (U.S. state)
Towns County, Georgia
Trail of Tears, 1830–1838
Transportation in the State of Georgia
:Category:Transportation in Georgia (U.S. state)
commons:Category:Transport in Georgia (U.S. state)

 Treutlen County, Georgia
 Troup County, Georgia
 Turner County, Georgia
 Twiggs County, Georgia

U
Union County, Georgia
United States of America
States of the United States of America
United States census statistical areas of Georgia
United States congressional delegations from Georgia
United States congressional districts in Georgia
United States Court of Appeals for the Eleventh Circuit
United States District Court for the Middle District of Georgia
United States District Court for the Northern District of Georgia
United States District Court for the Southern District of Georgia
United States Representatives from Georgia
United States Senators from Georgia
Universities and colleges in the State of Georgia
commons:Category:Universities and colleges in Georgia (U.S. state)
Upson County, Georgia
US-GA – ISO 3166-2:US region code for the State of Georgia

V

 Valdosta, Georgia

W
Walker County, Georgia
Walton County, Georgia
Ware County, Georgia
Warm Springs, Georgia
Warren County, Georgia
Washington County, Georgia
Water parks in the state of Georgia
Waterfalls of the state of Georgia
commons:Category:Waterfalls of Georgia (U.S. state)
Waterfalls of North Georgia
Wikimedia
Wikimedia Commons:Category:Georgia (U.S. state)
commons:Category:Maps of Georgia (U.S. state)
Wikinews:Category:Georgia (U.S. state)
Wikinews:Portal:Georgia (U.S. state)
Wikipedia Category:Georgia (U.S. state)
Wikipedia Portal:Georgia (U.S. state)
Wikipedia:WikiProject Georgia (U.S. state)
:Category:WikiProject Georgia (U.S. state) articles
Wikipedia:WikiProject Georgia (U.S. state)#Members

 Wayne County, Georgia

 Webster County, Georgia

 Wheeler County, Georgia
 White County, Georgia
 Whitfield County, Georgia
 Wilcox County, Georgia
 Wilkes County, Georgia
 Wilkinson County, Georgia
 Worth County, Georgia

X

Y

Z
Zoos in the state of Georgia
commons:Category:Zoos in Georgia (U.S. state)

See also

Topic overview:
Georgia (U.S. state)
Outline of Georgia (U.S. state)

Georgia (U.S. state)
 
Georgia (U.S. state)